Steven M. Landek (born December 23, 1955) is a member of the Illinois Senate representing the 12th district since his appointment in 2011. The 12th district includes all or parts of Bridgeview, Burbank, Bedford Park, McCook, Brookfield, Riverside, Berwyn, and Cicero.  Prior to the 2011 redistricting he represented the 11th district. He is currently the Mayor of Bridgeview and the Lyons Township Democratic Committeeman.

As mayor, Landek oversaw the construction of Toyota Park (now SeatGeek Stadium),  the  ex-home of the Chicago Fire Soccer Club and currently, home of the Chicago Red Stars.

State Senator
As of July 2022, Senator Landek is a member of the following Illinois Senate committees:

 Appropriations - Veterans Affairs Committee (SAPP-SAVA)
 Ethics Committee (SETH)
 Insurance Committee (SINS)
 Insurance Mandates Committee (SINS-INMD)
 Local Government Committee (SLGV)
 Redistricting - South Cook County Committee (SRED-SRSC)
 (Chairman of) State Government Committee (SGOA)

References

External links
Biography, bills and committees at the 98th Illinois General Assembly
By session: 98th, 97th
Illinois State Senator Steve Landek legislative website
Senator Steven M. Landek at Illinois Senate Democrats
Citizens for Steve Landek campaign website
 

1955 births
Democratic Party Illinois state senators
Living people
Politicians from Chicago
Roosevelt University alumni
Mayors of places in Illinois
American politicians of Polish descent
21st-century American politicians
People from Bridgeview, Illinois